James Huston (August 17, 1820 – September 21, 1854) was a Canadian typographer and journalist. Born in Quebec City, he was also a longtime member and subsequent President of the Institut canadien de Montréal.

Huston is best known as the compiler of Le répertoire national which was a collection of the works of Canadian writers for the previous half century.

He died in Quebec, aged 34.

References 
 Biography at the Dictionary of Canadian Biography Online

External links
 

1820 births
1854 deaths
Pre-Confederation Quebec people
Canadian typographers and type designers
Journalists from Quebec
People from Quebec City
19th-century Canadian journalists
Canadian male journalists